KSEY-FM 94.3 FM is a radio station licensed to Seymour, Texas.  The station broadcasts a country music format and is owned by Mark V. Aulabaugh.

References

External links
KSEY-FM's official website

SEY-FM
Country radio stations in the United States